Villa Alegre (Spanish for "joyous town") a commune and city located in Linares Province, Maule Region of Chile. With , Villa Alegre is the smallest commune by area in the Maule Region.

Demographics
Of these, 5,456 (37.1%) lived in urban areas and 9,269 (62.9%) in rural areas. Between the 1992 and 2002 censuses, the population fell by 2.8% (425 persons).

History
Villa Alegre was founded on May 6, 1891 and was one of the first places in Chile to have an electric tramway service, in 1915.

Economy
Villa Alegre and its neighbor San Javier are traditional winemaking areas. The Loncomilla valley, which includes these two communes, is endowed with some of the better vineyards and quality wines of the bountiful Maule Valley, in the Chile's central valley viticultural regions or appellations.

Government
As a commune, Villa Alegre is a third-level administrative division of Chile administered by a municipal council, headed by an alcalde who is directly elected every four years. The 2008-2012 alcalde is Arturo Palma Vilches (PPD), and the councilors are:
 María Ignacia González Torres (PDC)
 Héctor Del Tránsito Manosalva González (PRSD)
 Manuel Muñoz Bastias (PRSD)
 Justo Rebolledo Araya (PS)
 Eduardo Bustamante Maureira (RN)
 Edgardo Bravo Rebolledo (RN)

Within the electoral divisions of Chile, Villa Alegre is represented in the Chamber of Deputies by Jorge Tarud (PDC) and Romilio Gutiérrez (UDI) as part of the 39th electoral district, together with Linares, Colbún, San Javier and Yerbas Buenas. The commune is represented in the Senate by Hernán Larraín (UDI) and Ximena Rincón González (PDC) as part of the 11th senatorial constituency (Maule-South).

Famous People born in Villa Alegre 
 Juan Ignacio Molina, (Abate Molina): Jesuit priest, naturalist and scholar of the 18th and 19th centuries.
 Malaquías Concha Ortiz, politician and social reformer.
 Ismael Fuentes, footballer, current member of the Chile national football team

References

External links 

  Municipality of Villa Alegre
 Tourism in Villa Alegre
 The Silver Orange Festival in Villa Alegre
 Tourism
 The Tramways of Chile
 Google Map I of Villa Alegre
 Google Map II of Villa Alegre and River Loncomilla
 Internacional Artist's Residence SOCIAL SUMMER CAMP February 2010 (in Spanish).
 Hostal La Casona Solariega, Av. Francisco Antonio Encina paradero 21, Villa Alegre. Hostel and Popular Library

Populated places in Linares Province
Communes of Chile
Populated places established in 1891
1891 establishments in Chile